The Askeri İnzibat or AS.İZ, is the Military Police of the Turkish Armed Forces and constitute a very small dedicated force which handles military security and military crimes. Their area of jurisdiction is generally limited to military bases. Some of the other duties they perform are, protection and VIP detail provided to important bases or commanders and control of traffic inside the bases. They can be identified using the very obvious “AS. İZ.”, printed in large letters across the front of their helmets.

References 

Gendarmerie (Turkey)
Military provosts
Law enforcement agencies of Turkey